Cerik may refer to:
 Cerik (Brčko), a village in Brčko, Bosnia and Herzegovina
 Cerik (Lukavac), a village in Lukavac, Bosnia and Herzegovina
 Cerik (Srebrenik), a village in Srebrenik, Bosnia and Herzegovina
 Cerik, Tuzla, a village in Tuzla, Bosnia and Herzegovina
 Cerik Aldebrandt, a character in Mage & Demon Queen